Arville is a commune in the Seine-et-Marne department in the Île-de-France region in north-central France.

Demographics
The inhabitants are called Arvillois.

Bahamas
Many families also immigrated to the Bahamas, and carried the name "Darville" derived from "d'arville" meaning "of Arville".

See also
Communes of the Seine-et-Marne department

References

External links

1999 Land Use, from IAURIF (Institute for Urban Planning and Development of the Paris-Île-de-France région) 
 

Communes of Seine-et-Marne